Taiwanese Vietnamese or Vietnamese Taiwanese may be:
Taiwan–Vietnam relations
Taiwanese expatriates in Vietnam
Vietnamese people in Taiwan
Mixed race people of Taiwanese and Vietnamese descent
People with dual citizenship of Taiwan, Republic of China and Vietnam